John Louis Love (born February 24, 1944) is a former American football wide receiver in the National Football League for the Washington Redskins and the Los Angeles Rams.  He played college football at the University of North Texas and was drafted in the seventh round of the 1967 NFL Draft.

1944 births
Living people
People from Linden, Texas
American football wide receivers
North Texas Mean Green football players
Washington Redskins players
Los Angeles Rams players